Ferdinando Porcia (1835–1896) was an Italian painter, mainly of watercolors.

He exhibited at Venice, in 1887, a Studio of Velasquez; a watercolor depicting Capri, another on the Baths of Tiberius in Capri, and An atelier in Naples.

References

19th-century Italian painters
Italian male painters
1835 births
1896 deaths
19th-century Italian male artists